Gladicosa gulosa is a type of wolf spider found in Beech-Maple forests of the US and Canada, where the spider can be found in the plant strata of ground, herb or shrub.  It is not one of the more common wolf spiders.

Life cycle
This spider is nocturnal and hides during the day. It makes no web or shelter of any kind and hides under leaves in the day. The female carries its eggs in a spherical sac until they hatch, after which the spiderlings may ride on the female until able to fend for themselves.

References

External links
 Elliot, F.R. (1930). An ecological study of the spiders of the beech-maple forest. The Ohio Journal of Science, 30(1): 1-22. Retrieved March 29, 2007 from Ohio State Knowledge Bank. Article

Lycosidae
Spiders described in 1837
Spiders of North America